Toll Creagach (1,054 m) is a mountain in the Northwest Highlands of Scotland. It lies between Glen Affric in the south and Loch Mullardoch in Inverness-shire.

A domed shape mountain with corries on its slopes, it is usually climbed from the Affric side. The nearest village is Cannich to the east.

References

Marilyns of Scotland
Munros
One-thousanders of Scotland
Mountains and hills of the Northwest Highlands